Philosophers born in the 17th century (and others important in the history of philosophy), listed alphabetically:
Note: This list has a minimal criterion for inclusion and the relevance to philosophy of some individuals on the list is disputed.

A 
 Firmin Abauzit, (1679–1767)
 Yves Marie André, (1675–1764)
 Antoine Arnauld, (1612–1694)12*
 Mary Astell, (1666–1731)

B 
 John Balguy, (1686–1748)
 Pierre Bayle, (1647–1706)12
 Richard Bentley, (1662–1742)
 George Berkeley, (1685–1753)12
 François Bernier, (1620–1688)
 Hugh Binning, (1627–1653)
 Samuel Bold, (1649–1737)
 Robert Boyle, (1627–1691)12
 Peter Browne, (1666–1735)
 Thomas Browne, (1605–1682)
 Claude Buffier, (1661–1737)
 Richard Burthogge, (1638–1704)
 Joseph Butler, (1692–1752)12

C 
 Gershom Carmichael, (c. 1672–1729)
 Margaret Cavendish, (1623–1673)
 Walter Charleton, (1619–1707)
 William Chillingworth, (1602–1644)
 Samuel Clarke, (1675–1729)12
 Johannes Clauberg, (1622–1665)
 Catherine Trotter Cockburn, (1679–1749)
 Arthur Collier, (1680–1732)
 Anthony Collins, (1676–1729)12
 Lady Anne Finch Conway, (1631–1679)12
 Geraud de Cordemoy, (1626–1684)
 Jean-Pierre de Crousaz, (1663–1750)
 Ralph Cudworth, (1617–1688)12
 Nathaniel Culverwel, (1619–1651)
 Richard Cumberland, (c. 1631–1718)

D 
 John Theophilus Desaguliers, (1683–1744)
 Robert Desgabets, (1610–1678)
 Kenelm Digby, (1603–1665)
 Humphry Ditton, (1675–1715)

E 
 Elisabeth of Bohemia, (1618–1680)

F 
 Michelangelo Fardella, (1646–1718)
 François de Salignac de la Mothe-Fénelon, (1651–1715)
 Bernard le Bovier de Fontenelle, (1657–1757)
 Simon Foucher, (1644–1696)

G 
 Gadadhara Bhattacharya, (1604–1709)
 John Gay, (1685–1732)
 Arnold Geulincx, (1624–1669)12
 Joseph Glanvill, (1636–1680)
 Baltasar Gracián y Morales, (1601–1658)
 Guido Grandi, (1671–1742)

H 
 Han Wonjin, (1682–1751)
 James Harrington, (1611–1677)
 Franciscus Mercurius van Helmont, (1614–1698)
 Huang Zongxi (or ), (1610–1695)
 Pierre Daniel Huet, (1630–1721)
 Francis Hutcheson, (1694–1746)12
 Christiaan Huygens, (1629–1695)

I 
 Ito Jinsai, (1627–1705)

J 
 Samuel Johnson, (1649–1703)

K 
 Kaibara Ekiken, (1630–1740)
 Lord Kames, (1696–1782)
 Kumazawa Banzan, (1619–1691)

L 
 Louis de La Forge, (1632–1666)
 William Law, (1686–1761)
 Jean Le Clerc, (1657–1737)
 Antoine Le Grand, (1629–1699)
 Gottfried Leibniz, (1646–1716)12*
 John Locke, (1632–1704)12

M 
 Nicolas Malebranche, (1638–1715)12
 Bernard de Mandeville, (1670–1733)2
 Damaris Cudworth Masham, (1659–1708)
 Baron de Montesquieu (1689–1755)2
 Henry More, (1614–1687)

N 
 Isaac Newton, (1642–1727)12
 John Norris, (1657–1711)*

O 
 Ogyū Sorai, (1666–1728)

P 
 Blaise Pascal, (1623–1662)2
 Robert Joseph Pothier, (1699–1772)
 Samuel Pufendorf, (1632–1694)2

Q

R 
 John Ray, (1627–1705)
 Pierre-Sylvain Regis, (1632–1707)
 Hermann Samuel Reimarus, (1694–1768)
 Jacques Rohault, (1617–1672)

S 
 Anna Maria van Schurman, (1607–1678)
 John Sergeant, (1623–1704)
 Anthony Ashley-Cooper, 3rd Earl of Shaftesbury, (1671–1713)12
 Baruch Spinoza, (1632–1677)12
 James Dalrymple, 1st Viscount Stair, (1619–1695)
 Edward Stillingfleet, (1635–1699)
 Gabrielle Suchon, (1631–1703)
 Emanuel Swedenborg, (1688–1772)
 Algernon Sydney, (1623–1683)

T 
 Christian Thomasius, (1655–1728)
 Matthew Tindal, (1657–1733)
 John Toland, (1670–1722)12
 Ehrenfried Walther von Tschirnhaus, (1651–1708)
 George Turnball, (1698–1748)

U

V 
 Giambattista Vico, (1668–1744)12
 Voltaire, (1694–1778)12

W 
 Wang Fuzhi (or Wang Fu-Chih or Wang Chuanshan), (1619–1692)
 Benjamin Whichcote, (1609–1683)
 Gerrard Winstanley, (1609–1676)
 Christian Wolff, (1679–1754)12
 William Wollaston, (1659–1724)

X

Y 
 Yen Yuan (1635–1704)
 Yi Kan (1677–1727)

Z

Notes

See also 
 List of philosophers
 17th-century philosophy
 List of philosophers born in the centuries BC
 List of philosophers born in the 1st through 10th centuries
 List of philosophers born in the 11th through 14th centuries
 List of philosophers born in the 15th and 16th centuries
 List of philosophers born in the 18th century
 List of philosophers born in the 19th century
 List of philosophers born in the 20th century

17
Lists of 17th-century people